Anapisa endoxantha is a moth of the family Erebidae. It was described by George Hampson in 1914. It is found in Uganda.

References

Endemic fauna of Uganda
Moths described in 1914
Syntomini
Insects of Uganda
Erebid moths of Africa